Hövsan is a municipality in the eastern part of Baku, Azerbaijan.  It has a population of 85,000.

Notable natives 
 Mirzaagha Aliyev — actor, People's Artist of USSR (1949).
 Namig Islamzadeh — is an Azerbaijani military officer, major general serving in the Azerbaijani Armed Forces.

References

External links

Populated places in Baku